Michael Galvin (born 27 March 1967) is a New Zealand actor, singer and playwright, well known for his role as Chris Warner on the soap opera Shortland Street, a character he has played almost since the show's debut in 1992 until 1996 and again from 2000 to present, and remains as of 2023, the only original cast member. He is the longest serving television soap opera actor in New Zealand.

Early life
Galvin attended and graduated both Victoria University and Toi Whakaari: New Zealand Drama School. He graduated from Toi Whakaari in 1989 with a Diploma in Acting.

Career

Shortland Street
In 1992 Galvin, a theatre actor at the time, auditioned for a role as Chris Warner in the upcoming Television New Zealand soap opera, Shortland Street alongside his flatmate Marton Csokas. Galvin won the role, with Csokas later going on to play Leonard Dodds. Galvin predicted the show would only last 12 months.
Galvin portrayed Chris for four years, with the character picking up the nickname "Dr. Love" for the numerous love affairs he participated in. Galvin soon grew sick of portraying Chris, being quoted as saying "after four years on Shortland Street there was so much of me in Dr Warner I wasn't sure where he ended and I began." He quit and went travelling to seek further job opportunities.

Overseas and return to Shortland Street
During this time, he had roles in the television productions Highwater and Coverstory, and feature film The Climb, which starred John Hurt. Galvin was asked to return to Shortland Street in 2000 following a revamp of the show. He returned in the season final much to the delight of his fans. Since returning, Galvin has written many plays including the successful "Station to Station" and in 2007 Galvin was recognised as an outstanding emerging playwright, winning New Zealand's most significant national theatre award, the Bruce Mason Playwriting Award.

In October 2019 he was presented with a Scroll of Honour from the Variety Artists Club of New Zealand for his contribution to New Zealand entertainment.

Personal life
Galvin is married to Melissa Galvin with whom he shares a daughter named Lily. The couple married in 2004, but separated 5 years later. He was introduced to Melissa through on screen girlfriend Angela Bloomfield (Rachel McKenna).

Filmography

External links

References

1967 births
20th-century New Zealand male actors
21st-century New Zealand male actors
Living people
New Zealand male soap opera actors
New Zealand male television actors
New Zealand people of Irish descent
People educated at St. Patrick's College, Wellington
Toi Whakaari alumni
Victoria University of Wellington alumni